The Israel Defense Forces Gaza Division (Territorial), is subordinate to the Southern Regional Command. Its area of operation is the Gaza Strip and the area surrounding it. The division's commander is Brigadier-General Eliezer Toledano.

The Gaza Division had been entrusted with the safety and security of Jewish settlers in the Gaza Strip after the Six-Day War in times of peace and armed conflict. In August 2005, the division, along with the rest of the IDF, officially ended its presence in the Gaza Strip as part of Israel's unilateral disengagement plan when Jewish settlements were dismantled. However, the Gaza Division has repeatedly entered the Gaza Strip in response to rocket attacks from Palestinian militant groups based in Gaza.

In September 2015 the division was renamed 143rd "Fire Fox" (Territorial) Division.

Units 
 143rd "Fire Fox" (Territorial) Division
 "Gefen" (Territorial) Brigade (Northern Gaza)
 "Katif" (Territorial) Brigade (Southern Gaza)
 585th Bedouin Desert Reconnaissance Battalion
 414th "Nesher"/"Eagle" Field Intelligence Battalion
 Division Signal Battalion
 "Steel Cats" Heavy Engineer Company (Northern Gaza)
 "Knights of Steel" Heavy Engineer Company (Southern Gaza)

See also
Judea and Samaria Division
Operation Summer Rains (2006)

References

Divisions of Israel
Gaza Strip
Gaza–Israel conflict
Southern Command (Israel)